Cosmin Valentin Frăsinescu (born 10 February 1985) is a Romanian former professional footballer who played as a defender.

Honours
Khazar Lankaran
Azerbaijan Cup: 2010–11

References

External links
 
 
 

Living people
1985 births
Sportspeople from Bacău
Romanian footballers
Romania youth international footballers
Romania under-21 international footballers
ACF Gloria Bistrița players
CS Minaur Baia Mare (football) players
CS Gaz Metan Mediaș players
CS Universitatea Craiova players
FC Politehnica Iași (2010) players
Khazar Lankaran FK players
Liga I players
Liga II players
Azerbaijan Premier League players
Romanian expatriate sportspeople in Azerbaijan
Expatriate footballers in Azerbaijan
Association football defenders